Frederick Yates may refer to:
 Fred Yates (chess player) (1884–1932), also known as Frederick Dewhurst Yates, English chess master
 Frederick Henry Yates (1797–1842), English actor and theatre manager
 Frederick Yates (politician) (1914–1971), African-American politician and lawyer in Michigan

See also
 Frederic Yates (1854–1919), English painter
 Fred Yates (1922–2008), English artist